The House of Pallavicini, also known as Pallavicino and formerly known as Pelavicino, is an ancient Italian noble family founded by Oberto II Pelavicino of the Frankish Obertenghi family.

The Pallavicini of Genoa
The first recorded member of the Pallavicini family was Oberto I (died 1148). The first Pallavicino fief was created by Oberto II, who received it from Holy Roman Emperor Frederick Barbarossa in 1162. A number of lines are descended from Guglielmo (died 1217), possessor of a series of fiefs between Parma and Piacenza.

The Pallavicini of the Latin Empire
Through the descendants of Guy and his brother Rubino, sons of Guglielmo, a branch of the family rose to prominence in the Latin Empire founded after the Fourth Crusade in 1204.

They governed the Margraviate of Bodonitsa from 1204 to 1358. They grew in riches and, after 1224, became also the most powerful family in the former Kingdom of Thessalonica (northern Greece). The first margraves were of Guy's line until his daughter Isabella died, at which time the line of Rubino inherited the throne. The Pallavicini were related to the De la Roche family then ruling in Athens. After the death of Albert in 1311 the Pallavicini influence slowly declined. The subsequent Zorzi margraves were matrilineal descendants of the last Pallavicini marquise, Guglielma.

Notable members

 Oberto Pelavicino or Pallavicino (1197-1269), Italian field captain under Frederick II, Holy Roman Emperor
 Oberto I Pallavicino
 Oberto II Pallavicino
 Guglielmo Pallavicino (Pallavicino) (died 1217)
 Guy (died 1237)
 Ubertino (died 1278)
 Isabella (died 1286)
 Albert (died 1311)
 Thomas (born before 1286, died after 1331), margrave of Bodonitsa, grandson of Rubino
 Guglielma (died 1358)
 Orlando (sometimes Rolando) “il Magnifico” (c.1393–1457)
 Antonio Pallavicini Gentili (1441–1507), Italian Cardinal considered papabile in 1492
 Battista Pallavicino (died 1466), Roman Catholic Bishop of Reggio Emilia (1444–1466)
 Carlo Pallavicino (died 1497), Italian Roman Catholic bishop of Lodi (1456–1497)
 Giovanni Battista Pallavicino (1480–1524), Italian Roman Catholic bishop and cardinal
 Cipriano Pallavicino (1509–1585), Roman Catholic Archbishop of Genoa (1568–1585) and Apostolic Nuncio to Naples (1566)
 Sir Horatio Pallavicino (c. 1540 – 1600), merchant, financier, and diplomat in England
 Benedetto Pallavicino (c. 1551 – 1601), from Cremona, composer
 Francesco Sforza Pallavicino (1607–1667), Italian historian and cardinal
 Ferrante Pallavicino (1618–1644), Italian writer of antisocial and obscene stories and novels with biblical and profane themes
 Carlo Pallavicino (c. 1630 – 1688), Italian composer
 Stefano Benedetto Pallavicino (1672–1742), Italian poet and opera librettist
 Caterina Imperiale Lercari Pallavicini (fl. 1721), Neo-Latin poet
 Lazzaro Opizio Pallavicino (1776–1777), Camerlengo of the Sacred College of Cardinals
 Gian Carlo Pallavicino (1722-1794), the 179th Doge of the Republic of Genoa
 Gianluca Pallavicino, general and governor of Lombardy (second half of 18th century)
 Emilio Pallavicini (1823–1901), general and senator who defeated Garibaldi at the battle of Aspromonte
 Johann, Markgraf von Pallavicini (1848–1941), Austro-Hungarian diplomat
 Marchesa Anna d'Androgna Parravicini, (1840-1922) Noblewoman and patron of the arts 
 Markgraf (Őrgróf) Tamás Csáky-Pallavicini (1960- ), Secretary General of the World Federation of Catholic Medical Associations in the Vatican
 Countess Elisabeth d'Udekem d'Acoz, sister of Queen Mathilde of Belgium, married Margrave Alfonso Pallavicini in July 2006.

Family tree

See also 

A number of buildings are named after the family:
 Palais Pallavicini in Vienna, Austria
 Palazzo Pallavicini-Rospigliosi in Rome, Italy
 Villa Durazzo-Pallavicini near Genoa, Italy
 Palazzo Pallavicini in Bologna, Italy
 Villa Gandolfi-Pallavicini in Bologna, Italy
 Palazzo Pallavicino  in Parma, Italy

References

Sources
Miller, W. "The Marquisate of Boudonitza (1204–1414)." Journal of Hellenic Studies, Vol. 28, 1908, pp 234–249.
Setton, Kenneth M. (general editor) A History of the Crusades: Volume III — The Fourteenth and Fifteenth Centuries. Harry W. Hazard, editor. University of Wisconsin Press: Madison, 1975.

Marquisate of Bodonitsa

External links

 The Pallavicino Foundation (Genoa)

 
Italian noble families
People of medieval Greece
Republic of Genoa families